Pellatt is a surname. Notable people with the surname include:

Apsley Pellatt (1791–1863), English glassware manufacturer and politician
Apsley Pellatt (1763–1826), (1763–1826), English glass manufacturer
Henry Pellatt, C.V.O. (1859–1939), Canadian financier and soldier
Mary Pellatt (née Dodgson) (1857–1924), the first Chief Commissioner of the Girl Guides of Canada

See also
Bellatti
Pellet (disambiguation)
Platte (surname)